Charles Jonas (born Karel Jonáš, October 24, 1840January 15, 1896) was a Czech American immigrant, journalist, linguist, and political activist.  He was the 16th lieutenant governor of Wisconsin and served in the Wisconsin Legislature, representing Racine County.  Later in life, he was an American consul general to Austria-Hungary, and the Russian and German empires.

His former home in Racine, Wisconsin, the Karel Jonas House is now listed in the National Register of Historic Places.  It is located at 1337 North Erie Street.

Background 
Karel Jonáš was born on 24 October 1840 in Malešov house 32 to Ignác Jonáš and Terezie Rubínová. He studied at what was then the Bohemian School of Science and Polytechnic Institute in Prague, as well as attending lectures at Charles University in Prague. A strong Czech nationalist and friend of Vojtěch Náprstek, he fled Bohemia in 1860 after clashes with the authorities, moving via Bremen to London, where he continued to work as a journalist. In March 1863 he emigrated to Racine, Wisconsin, just south of Milwaukee (where Náprstek had been the first Czech to publish a periodical in the United States); there he edited and published the Czech language newspaper Slavie.

Elective office and consular service 
Jonas was skeptical of Abraham Lincoln and the policies of the Republican Party (which he saw as too centralist), and he gradually came to be affiliated with the Democrats. He was appointed to the Board of Managers of the Wisconsin Industrial School for Boys (a reform school) for 1874–1877, serving only through 1875.

He was elected an alderman for the City of Racine, serving from 1876 to 1883, and would serve as president of the Common Council of Racine for 1878–79.

He was elected as a Democratic member of the Wisconsin State Assembly in 1877 to represent the 1st Racine County district (the City of Racine) (incumbent Republican Norton J. Field was not a candidate for re-election), with 1229 votes to 760 for Republican Edward Gillen; he was assigned to the standing committees on the judiciary and on education. He was not a candidate for re-election in 1878, choosing instead to run on the Greenback Party ticket for the Wisconsin Senate's Third District (Racine County), losing to Republican William Everett Chipman by 3206 to 2177 (there was no Democratic candidate in the race, and some candidates that year ran as Democrats and Greenbackers simultaneously). He was succeeded in the Assembly by Field.

He ran again for the Senate in 1882 as a Democrat (to succeed Republican Albert L. Phillips, who was not a candidate for re-election), winning this time with 3213 votes to 2494 for Republican William T. Lewis; and was assigned to the committees on education and on enrolled bills.  He did not run for re-election in 1886, and was succeeded by Republican Henry Allen Cooper.

On November 17, 1886, Jonas was appointed U. S. Consul at Prague by President Grover Cleveland, which position he held until July 16, 1889.

In 1890 he was elected 16th Lieutenant Governor of Wisconsin with a plurality of 34,974 in a four-way race, well ahead of his running mate, Milwaukee mayor George Wilbur Peck. He would serve in that office from 1891 until 1894, when he resigned to become the U.S consul in St. Petersburg, Russia; in 1896, he was transferred to Crefeld, Germany, where he died that same year.

Although in 1919 the Department of State informed author Thomas Čapek that Jonas died of heart failure, recent scholarship has determined that Jonas shot himself. After his death, Jonas was buried in Prague's Olšany Cemetery.

Sources

Electoral history

Wisconsin Assembly (1877)

| colspan="6" style="text-align:center;background-color: #e9e9e9;"| General Election, November 6, 1877

Wisconsin Senate (1878)

| colspan="6" style="text-align:center;background-color: #e9e9e9;"| General Election, November 5, 1878

Wisconsin Senate (1882)

| colspan="6" style="text-align:center;background-color: #e9e9e9;"| General Election, November 7, 1882

Wisconsin Lieutenant Governor (1890, 1892)

| colspan="6" style="text-align:center;background-color: #e9e9e9;"| General Election, November 4, 1890

| colspan="6" style="text-align:center;background-color: #e9e9e9;"| General Election, November 8, 1892

References 

1840 births
1896 deaths
American politicians who committed suicide
Czech activists
Czech-American history
American people of Czech descent
Austro-Hungarian emigrants to the United States
Czech journalists
Czech language activists
Linguists from the Czech Republic
Czech nationalists
Czech Technical University in Prague alumni
Czech-American culture in Wisconsin
Editors of Wisconsin newspapers
Journalists from Wisconsin
Lieutenant Governors of Wisconsin
Democratic Party members of the Wisconsin State Assembly
Wisconsin city council members
Wisconsin Greenbacks
19th-century American politicians
Democratic Party Wisconsin state senators
Politicians from Racine, Wisconsin
19th-century American journalists
American male journalists
19th-century American diplomats
American consuls
19th-century American male writers
Burials in the Czech Republic
1890s suicides